Super Sun is the debut studio album by Nigerian alternative soul artist Emmanuel Bezhiwa Idakula, also known as Bez. It was released via Cobhams Asuquo’s label CAMP in July 2011.

Two singles "Stop Pretending" and "Zuciya Daya" (en: Whole Heart) were released through the Hennessy Artistry series platform in 2009. This helped to promote the album, which was eventually released two years later. The album did well in the market, though it was hard to measure sales due to the uniqueness of the industry in Nigeria. However, Universal Music Publishing South Africa has licensed it territorially.

The album's title was chosen as a reflection of Bez's words as he stated "..everybody wants to be a super star, but they've never know what kind they want to be. I want to be The Super Sun, it’s the most unique star that gives warmth, life, energy and light".

Overview

A few years before the album's release, Bez signed a contract with Cobhams Asuquo Music Productions (CAMP) with the help of producer and record label owner Cobhams Asuquo. Afterwards, he was featured as the opening act for international stars such as Aṣa, Angie Stone and Yolanda Adams. Bez also performed at events such as the Lagos Jazz Series, as well as alongside top music acts like Nneka, 2face, Mike Aremu, and South African-based Judith Sephuma.

Recording
Seven songs on the album were mixed by five-time Grammy nominated mixing engineer, Ryan West. He is best known for doing hip-hop and R&B mixes for Rihanna, Eminem, Jay Z, T.I., and Usher. Nicolas Mollard, a well known French guitarist and member of Aṣa’s band, played guitar on the song "Technically". Cobhams Asuquo produced most of the song, while Olaitan Dada assisted on a few of them.

Release
Super Sun was released in 2011, and includes the single "Stupid Song". The Boston Globe placed it at number 3 on its list of World music’s top albums of 2011, calling Bez a "superb alternative-soul singer". Connect Nigeria called it "unusual and just a perfect blend for a debut album"

Super Sun was released digitally on iTunes on 24 July 2011.

Accolades
Super Sun was nominated for Best R&B/Pop Album at the 2012 edition of The Headies.

Track listing
The following is the album's track listing. All songs were produced by Cobhams Asuquo.

Personnel
Complete list of personnel include:

 IBK Spaceship boi – Vocals
 Omolara Ayodele – Vocals
 Samuel Onwudo – Drums
 Akinwande Cole – Electric Guitars
 Cobhams Asuquo  - Guitars and Keyboards, composer, producer, arranger, vocals
 Bez Idakula – Guitars and Vocals, composer, arranger
 Daniel Oyewole- Bass
 Olaitan Dada – Engineer, Mixing
 Joan Ekpai- Engineer, Mixing
 Enoch – Engineer
 Ryan West – Mixing and Mastering Engineer
 Enyi Omeruah – A&R
 Eva – Vocals
 eLDee – Vocals
 Ice Prince – Vocals
 Nicolas Mollard- Electric Guitars
 Praiz – Vocals

References

2011 albums
Bez (musician) albums
Albums produced by Cobhams Asuquo